Zou Lijuan is a Chinese track and field athlete. She won a gold medal at the Women's Javelin Throw F34 event at the 2016 Summer Paralympics with a world record of 21.86. She also won a gold medal at the Women's Shot Put F34 event.
At the 2020 Summer Paralympics she won a gold medal in Women’s Javelin Throw F34 with a world record of 22.28. She also won a gold medal at the Women's Shot Put F34 event with a world record of 9.19. She won six gold medals at World Para Athletics Championships.

References

External links 
 

Living people
Athletes (track and field) at the 2016 Summer Paralympics
Medalists at the 2016 Summer Paralympics
Paralympic gold medalists for China
Paralympic athletes of China
Chinese female javelin throwers
Chinese female shot putters
World Para Athletics Championships winners
Paralympic medalists in athletics (track and field)
Athletes (track and field) at the 2020 Summer Paralympics
1994 births
21st-century Chinese women